Pound Ridge Historic District is a national historic district located at Pound Ridge, Westchester County, New York. The district contains 46 contributing buildings and encompasses almost all of the hamlet.  The majority of the buildings in the district date between 1780 and 1852.  The earliest building was built in 1758 and is the Capt. Joseph Lockwood House (only four families have lived in it since Joseph Lockwood build it).  Notable buildings include: Methodist Episcopal (Community) Church (1833), Patterson Memorial Presbyterian Church (conant Hall, 1893), Presbyterian Lecture Hall (Pound Ridge Town Hall, 1852), Parker Store (1906), Pound Ridge Village School (Hiram Halle Memorial Library, 1851), Aaron Wood's Mill (ca. 1800), Partridge Thatcher House (1788), Maj. Ebenezer Lockwood House (ca. 1780), Alsop Hunt Lockwood House (1840), and Solomon Lockwood House (ca. 1800).

It was added to the National Register of Historic Places in 1985.

See also

National Register of Historic Places listings in northern Westchester County, New York

References

Historic districts on the National Register of Historic Places in New York (state)
Colonial Revival architecture in New York (state)
Victorian architecture in New York (state)
Buildings and structures in Westchester County, New York
National Register of Historic Places in Westchester County, New York